Ballybrit Race Track, also known as Galway Racecourse, is a horse race course in County Galway, Ireland. It is located in the townland of Ballybrit, in the environs of Castlegar, just north of the N6 Bóthar na dTreabh, c.6 km northeast of Galway  city.

The track has two stands, the Main Stand and Millennium Stand.

The 7-day Galway Races Festival is held here every August.

Other meetings are held here in September (2 days), early October (1 day) and over the last weekend in October (3 days).

Course information
Ballybrit is a right-handed course of about one mile and three furlongs, with a steep decline into the dip where the last two fences are situated. These fences are known for being the closest two fences on any racecourse in the world. There is a sharp incline to the finish line.

History
The first meeting was held in 1869.

As part of his visit to Ireland in 1979, Pope John Paul II celebrated mass at the racecourse for two hundred and eighty thousand people. The then Mayor of Galway, Michéal Ó hUiginn, conferred the Freedom of Galway upon the Pontiff.

In 2021, during the COVID-19 pandemic in the Republic of Ireland, the racecourse was used as a mass vaccination centre.

Notable races

References

External links 
Official website

 
Horse racing venues in the Republic of Ireland
Sports venues in County Galway
Sports venues completed in 1869
1869 establishments in Ireland